Simple Network Paging Protocol (SNPP) is a protocol that defines a method by which a pager can receive a message over the Internet. It is supported by most major paging providers, and serves as an alternative to the paging modems used by many telecommunications services. It is a fairly simple protocol that may run over TCP port 444 and sends out a page using only a handful of well-documented commands.

Connecting and using SNPP servers
It is relatively easy to connect to a SNPP server only requiring a telnet client and the address of the SNPP server. The port 444 is standard for SNPP servers, and it is free to use from the sender's point of view. Maximum message length can be carrier-dependent. Once connected, a user can simply enter the commands to send a message to a pager connected to that network. For example, you could then issue the PAGE command with the number of the device to which you wish to send the message. After that issue the MESS command with the text of the message you wish to send following it. You can then issue the SEND command to send out the message to the pager and then QUIT, or send another message to a different device. The protocol also allows you to issue multiple PAGE commands, stacking them one after the other, per message effectively allowing you to send the same message to several devices on that network with one MESS and SEND command pair.

References

External links
 rfc-editor.org - RFC 1861

Network protocols